Serinevler Athletics Stadium is a sports venue for athletics competitions in track and field located in Yüreğir, Adana.

Gallery

References

Sport venues in Adana
Yüreğir
Athletics (track and field) venues in Turkey